DYEM (96.7 FM), broadcasting as 96.7 Bai Radio, is a Philippines radio station owned and operated by Negros Broadcasting & Publishing Corporation, a local media outlet of Ely Dejaresco which also owns The Negros Chronicle, the longest running weekly newspaper in the city and the province of Negros Oriental. Its studios and transmitter facilities are located at 106 EJ Blanco Dr., Brgy. Piapi, Dumaguete. This station operates from 3:00 AM to 11:00 PM.

DYEM is the pioneer FM radio station in Dumaguete. It was affiliated with Ultrasonic Broadcasting System's Energy FM network from 2000 to 2013.

History
DYEM was launched on March 26, 1980, becoming Dumaguete's first FM radio station.

In the 1990s, DYEM carried the brand Love Radio (not to be confused with Manila Broadcasting Company's Love Radio Network). It aired a soft adult contemporary and format, similar to DYRK in Cebu. The station later became popular with listeners because of its music format, its programming, which includes a weekly countdown program, and was also the "official radio station" for concerts held in Dumaguete.

In 1991, when Power 95 was launched, DYEM's owner, Negros Broadcasting & Publishing Inc., filed a case against the owners, Gold Label Broadcasting Inc., because the station was broadcasting at 95.7 MHz, nearer to DYEM's frequency. DYGB's owners later responded to DYEM's case by moving DYGB to its current frequency.

In 2000, Ultrasonic Broadcasting System took over the station's operations and renamed it as Energy FM. In 2010, it was renamed as Star Energy FM.

On November 24, 2013, the station rebranded as Bai Radio to prevent confusion with DYMD, which was acquired by UBSI the month before and since carries the Energy FM brand.

On November 7, 2019, the broadcaster Dindo Generoso was shot dead as he was on his way to a radio program "Konsencia sa Provincia". He was a longtime block timer of local politicians. He was also spokesman of Dumaguete mayor Felipe Antonio Ipe Remollo.

References

Radio stations in Dumaguete
Radio stations established in 1980